Choqa-ye Sefid (also Romanized as Choqā-ye Sefīd) is a village in Baladarband Rural District, in the Central District of Kermanshah County, Kermanshah Province, Iran. At the 2006 census, its population was 36, in 7 families.

References 

Populated places in Kermanshah County